Miles Reid (born 5 September 1998) is a rugby union player for Bath Rugby. He plays as a back row forward.

Made his senior debut for Bath in January 2018 against Newcastle Falcons in the Anglo-Welsh Cup. Bath won 21-8 at the Rec.

He received praise for his performance against Ospreys as Bath won 32-19 to make the 2017-18 Anglo-Welsh Cup semi finals.

Personal life
Educated at Beechen Cliff School, Bath.

References

Living people
1998 births
Bath Rugby players
People educated at Beechen Cliff School
Rugby union flankers